Verran Mitchell Tucker (born June 26, 1988) is a former American football wide receiver. He was signed by the Dallas Cowboys as an undrafted free agent in 2010. He played college football at California.

College career

Junior college

Freshman year
Tucker caught 16 passes for 229 yards and four touchdowns in 2006.

Sophomore year
In 2007, Tucker had 26 receptions for 538 yards and a team-high nine touchdowns.

California Golden Bears

Junior year
In his first year at Cal, Tucker was a reserve, but then moved up on the depth chart. He started the last seven games of the year. He was second on the team with 362 yards on 21 catches. He had three touchdowns.

Senior year
In Tucker's final year at Cal, he had 29 receptions for 453 yards and one touchdown. He had at least 50 receiving yards in five of the team's games in 2009. He ended his college career with 50 catches for 815 yards and four touchdowns, with an average of 16.3 yards per catch.

Professional career

Dallas Cowboys
Tucker went undrafted in the 2010 NFL Draft and agreed to terms with the Dallas Cowboys a day later. He was cut on July 23, 2010.

Kansas City Chiefs
Tucker signed with the Kansas City Chiefs on July 31, 2010.

Tucker caught his first career NFL touchdown pass on November 7, 2010 against the Oakland Raiders.

Spokane Shock
Tucker signed with the Spokane Shock on February 13, 2012

References

External links

NFL.com Draft Profile
California Golden Bears profile
Dallas Cowboys bio
Kansas City Chiefs bio

1988 births
Living people
American football wide receivers
California Golden Bears football players
Dallas Cowboys players
Edmonton Elks players
Kansas City Chiefs players
Players of American football from Torrance, California
Spokane Shock players